In Greek mythology, Amphoterus (Ancient Greek: Ἀμφότερός) was the son of Alcmaeon by Callirrhoe (daughter of the river god Achelous), and brother of Acarnan.

Mythology 
Amphoterus, just like his brother, suddenly became grown-up in order to avenge his father. The sons of Phegeus, who had killed Alcmaeon, were carrying the necklace of Harmonia to Delphi to dedicate it, and came to the house of Agapenor at the same time as Amphoterus and his brother Acarnan. These, then, killed their father's murderers, and going to Psophis and entering the palace they slew both king Phegeus and his wife.

Note

Reference 
 Apollodorus, The Library with an English Translation by Sir James George Frazer, F.B.A., F.R.S. in 2 Volumes, Cambridge, MA, Harvard University Press; London, William Heinemann Ltd. 1921. ISBN 0-674-99135-4. Online version at the Perseus Digital Library. Greek text available from the same website.

Characters in Greek mythology
Mythology of Argos